
This is a list of pubs in London. 

A pub, formally public house, is a drinking establishment in the culture of Britain, Ireland, Australia, Canada and Denmark. In many places, especially in villages, a pub can be the focal point of the community. The writings of Samuel Pepys describe the pub as the heart of England.

London is the capital and most populous city of England and the United Kingdom. Between 2001 and 2016, London lost 25% of its pubs (1,220 pubs).

London pubs by borough

Barking and Dagenham

Barnet

Bexley

Brent

Bromley

Camden

City of London

Croydon

Ealing

Enfield

Greenwich

Hackney

Hammersmith and Fulham

Haringey

Harrow

Havering

Hillingdon

Hounslow

Islington

Kensington and Chelsea

Kingston upon Thames

Lambeth

Lewisham

Merton

Newham

Redbridge

Richmond upon Thames

Southwark

Sutton

Tower Hamlets

Waltham Forest

Wandsworth

City of Westminster

Soho

See also

 Pubs in Covent Garden 
 Grade II listed pubs in London (category)
 List of award-winning pubs in London
 List of bars
 List of companies based in London
 List of public house topics
 List of real London pubs in literature
 List of restaurants in London
 Wetherspoons

References

Further reading

 
 
 
 
 

 
London
Pubs